Najia Baig is a Pakistani television presenter, actress and comedian. She is best known for hosting Political satire Hasb-e-Haal on Duniya News from 2009 to 2016 and later for her character roles in television serials.

Filmography

Television

Film

References

External links 

Living people
Pakistani television hosts
Pakistani women television presenters
1982 births